Amanda Kotaja (born 3 January 1995) is a Finnish Paralympic athlete who competes in sprinting events in international level events. She is a Paralympic silver medalist, three-time World champion and a three-time European champion.

References

1995 births
Living people
Paralympic athletes of Finland
Finnish female wheelchair racers
Athletes (track and field) at the 2012 Summer Paralympics
Athletes (track and field) at the 2016 Summer Paralympics
Athletes (track and field) at the 2020 Summer Paralympics
Sportspeople from Satakunta
Medalists at the 2020 Summer Paralympics
Paralympic silver medalists for Finland
Medalists at the World Para Athletics Championships
World Para Athletics Championships winners
Medalists at the World Para Athletics European Championships
20th-century Finnish women
21st-century Finnish women